The Zero candy bar, introduced in 1920, is a candy bar composed of a combination of caramel, peanut and almond nougat covered with a layer of white chocolate fudge. Its outwardly white color — an unusual color for a candy bar — has become its trademark. The coating melted at a higher temperature than brown chocolates, making the bar a popular choice for summer vending in the pre-air conditioning South. Zero resembles Snickers, a candy manufactured by Mars, except Zero is white instead of dark brown.

History
Zero was first launched by the Hollywood Brands candy company of Minneapolis, Minnesota, in 1920 as the Double Zero Bar and was renamed "Zero" in 1934. It is said the name "double" zero was implied to suggest the Zero bar was "cool", as in low in temperature. Initial manufacturing of the candy bar began at its factory in Centralia, Illinois, and continued through many acquisitions of the company. 
 
Hollywood Brands was first sold to Consolidated Foods Corporation in 1967 (which later became Sara Lee) and production continued after a fire destroyed the Centralia plant in 1980. A new production facility opened in 1983, and in 1988 Hollywood Brands was purchased by Huhtamaki Oyj of Helsinki, Finland, and became part of Leaf, Inc.

Hershey Foods Corporation took over Leaf North America confectionery operations in 1996, and with it came the production of the Zero candy bar.

Variation and sale 
The candy bar is sold in three different sizes. According to the official website, its traditional size is a singular bar at 1.85 oz, comparable to the traditional full-size Hershey Bar which is 1.55oz.  As of 2020, the candy bar can also be purchased in a king size at 3.4 oz. Finally, the candy is sold in a pack of 6 containing individually wrapped bars coming in at 1.85 oz.

The candy can be purchased on numerous online sites, including Amazon. An American chain and online market known as Dollar General also sells the individual 1.85oz bar for a total of $0.95 (USD) in-store only.

Reviews 
In October 2020, Link Neal and Rhett McLaughlin of Good Mythical Morning deemed the Zero bar the "worst candy bar in the world" in a multi-day bracketed review of several different candy bars.

Some critics have deemed the bar as a "white chocolate Snickers", even though the Zero bar predates Snickers by a decade.

See also
 List of chocolate bar brands

References

External links 
 

Chocolate bars
The Hershey Company brands
Products introduced in 1920
Brand name confectionery